The Florida Complex League Blue Jays are a Rookie-level affiliate of the Toronto Blue Jays, competing in the Florida Complex League of Minor League Baseball. Prior to 2021, the team was known as the Gulf Coast League Blue Jays.  The team plays its home games in Dunedin, Florida, at the Bobby Mattick Training Center at Englebert Complex. The team is composed mainly of players who are in their first year of professional baseball either as draftees or non-drafted free agents from the United States, Canada, Dominican Republic, Venezuela and other countries.

History
The team first competed in the Gulf Coast League (GCL) during 1981–1985 and 1991–1995. After being absent from the league from 1996 through 2006, the team returned to the GCL in 2007, replacing the Pulaski Blue Jays of the Appalachian League in the Blue Jays' farm system. The team won division titles in 1992 and 2015, but has yet to capture a league championship.

Prior to the 2021 season, the Gulf Coast League was renamed as the Florida Complex League (FCL).

Year-by-year records

Roster

References

External links
 Official website

Florida Complex League teams
Professional baseball teams in Florida
Toronto Blue Jays minor league affiliates
1981 establishments in Florida
Baseball teams established in 1981
Dunedin, Florida